Marcel Flückiger (20 June 1929 – 27 November 2010) was a Swiss football defender who played for Switzerland in the 1954 FIFA World Cup. He also played for BSC Young Boys.

References

1929 births
Swiss men's footballers
Switzerland international footballers
Association football defenders
BSC Young Boys players
1954 FIFA World Cup players
2010 deaths
Footballers from Bern
Swiss Super League players